The 53rd Texas Legislature met from January 13, 1953, to May 27, 1953, and March 15, 1954, to April 13, 1954. All members present during this session were elected in the 1952 general elections.

Sessions

Regular Session: January 13, 1953 – May 27, 1953

Called Session: March 15, 1954 – April 13, 1954

Party summary

Senate

House

Officers

Senate
 Lieutenant Governor: Ben Ramsey (D)
 President Pro Tempore: Rogers Kelley (D)  Jimmy Phillips (D)  Gus J. Strauss (D)  Dorsey B. Hardeman (D)

House
 Speaker of the House: Reuben Senterfitt (D)

Members

Senate

Dist. 1
 Howard A. Carney (D), Atlanta

Dist. 2
 Wardlow Lane (D), Center

Dist. 3
 Ottis E. Lock (D), Lufkin

Dist. 4
 Jep Fuller (D), Port Arthur

Dist. 5
 Mrs. Neveille H. Colson (D), Navasota

Dist. 6
 James E. Taylor (D), Kerens

Dist. 7
 Warren McDonald (D), Tyler

Dist. 8
 George M. Parkhouse (D), Dallas

Dist. 9
 Joe Carter (D), Sherman

Dist. 10
 Doyle Willis (D), Fort Worth

Dist. 11
 William T. "Bill" Moore (D), Bryan

Dist. 12
 Crawford Martin (D), Hillsboro

Dist. 13
 Jarrard Secrest (D), Temple

Dist. 14
 Johnnie B. Rogers (D), Austin

Dist. 15
 Gus J. Strauss (D), Hallettsville

Dist. 16
 Searcy Bracewell (D), Houston

Dist. 17
 Jimmy Phillips (D), Angleton

Dist. 18
 John J. Bell (D), Cuero

Dist. 19
 Rudolph A. Weinert (D), Seguin

Dist. 20
 William H. Shireman (D), Corpus Christi

Dist. 21
 Abraham Kazen (D), Laredo

Dist. 22
 Wayne Wagonseller (D), Stoneburg

Dist. 23
 George Moffett (D), Chillicothe

Dist. 24
 Harley Sadler (D), Abilene

Dist. 25
 Dorsey B. Hardeman (D), San Angelo

Dist. 26
 Oswald Latimer (D), San Antonio

Dist. 27
 Rogers Kelly (D), Edinburg

Dist. 28
 Keith Kelly (D), Fort Worth

Dist. 29
 James T. Rutherford (D), Odessa

Dist. 30
 Andrew J. "Andy" Rogers (D), Childress

Dist. 31
 Grady Hazlewood (D), Amarillo

House
The House was composed of 149 Democrats and 1 Independent, Charles J. Lieck, Jr.,  elected as a member of the conservative Good Government League of San Antonio.

House members included future Governor Dolph Briscoe, future federal judge Barefoot Sanders and future Congressmen Kika de la Garza, Joe Kilgore, and Joe Pool, as well as future Texas Attorney General Waggoner Carr, and future Texas Agriculture Commissioner Jack Hightower.

Sources
 Legislative Reference Library of Texas,

External links

53rd Texas Legislature
1953 in Texas
1954 in Texas
1953 U.S. legislative sessions
1954 U.S. legislative sessions